The PRFU is the official governing body of the sport of Rugby Union in the Philippines. The PRFU was founded in 1998 and was granted full World Rugby membership in 2008. Philippine Rugby is a non-profit national sports association registered with SEC focused on growing and developing the sport of Rugby Union in the Philippines. The PRFU board consists of seven board members and a full-time staff of four full-time employees and consultants along with a number of regional Development Officers/Coaches located all over the country. The PRFU and its Development Officers provide free training in contact rugby for schools, institutions, clubs and local foundations.

The PRFU are registered accredited members of both World Rugby and Asia Rugby as well as being recognized by the Philippine Olympic Committee and Philippine Sports Commission. 

Over the last decade, the sport of Rugby Union has become more popular in the Philippines as it has seen success in both the Men and Women’s national team programs. The Filipino public has started to admire, learn and support the sport of Rugby as the Philippine Volcanoes have proven to attract supporters with successful performances rising from the sixth tier of the Asia Rugby Championships to the first tier in successive years. The Philippine Volcanoes are the only team in Asia to achieve this feat. The 7s format has also seen the Philippine Volcanoes on a remarkable rise proving nothing is impossible after qualifying for the 7s Rugby World Cup just five years after their inclusion in the Asian 7s Series. The most recent successes have seen both the Gold medal finish for the Men’s and the Silver medal finish for the women’s in the recent 2019 South East Asian Games held in Clark, Philippines.

Why "Philippine Volcanoes"? 

The team name Philippine Volcanoes was adopted from the 1st Filipino Infantry Regiment composed of Filipino Americans who saw battle during World War 2. The first Philippine National Rugby Team that participated in their first international tournament was a mix of Expat and Filipino players. Thus, the team name.

See also 
Philippines national rugby union team

External links 
Philippine Rugby Football Union official website
Philippines at IRB.com
Philippines at Rugby in Asia

Rugby union in the Philippines
Rugby Union
Rugby union governing bodies in Asia

Sports organizations established in 1998